Luis Hernán Cabezas Chavarría (born 25 March 1992) is a Chilean former footballer who played as a forward for clubs in Chile, Sweden and El Salvador.

Career
Cabezas came to Naval youth system at the age of thirteen, staying with them until 2015. In March 2015, he moved to Sweden and joined IF Brommapojkarna in the Superettan. As a player of Huachipato, in June 2015 he joined Åtvidabergs FF after a trial along with his compatriot Joaquín Cerezo.

In second half 2015, he returned to Naval until 2016, playing for Deportes Limache and Deportivo Estación Central in his homeland.

In 2019, he moved abroad again and played for Salvadoran side Chalatenango in the 2019 Apertura of the Primera División.

Personal life
Cabezas is the nephew of the former Chilean international footballer Luis Chavarría.

References

External links
 
 
 Luis Cabezas at PlaymakerStats.com
 
 Luis Cabezas at Resultater.nrk.no 

1992 births
Living people
People from Monte Águila
Chilean footballers
Chilean expatriate footballers
Naval de Talcahuano footballers
IF Brommapojkarna players
C.D. Huachipato footballers
Åtvidabergs FF players
Deportes Limache footballers
Primera B de Chile players
Segunda División Profesional de Chile players
Chilean Primera División players
Superettan players
Salvadoran Primera División players
Chilean expatriate sportspeople in Sweden
Chilean expatriate sportspeople in El Salvador
Expatriate footballers in El Salvador
Expatriate footballers in Sweden
Association football forwards